Margarita Plevritou (born November 17, 1994) is a Greek water polo player currently playing for Olympiacos and the Greece women's national team. She was part of the Greek team that won the silver medal at the 2018 European Championship in Barcelona.

Career
As a professional player for Olympiacos, Plevritou has won the LEN Women's Euro League, the LEN Super Cup, the Women's LEN Trophy, and several Greek Women's Water Polo League titles.

International competitions
 2018 Women's European Water Polo Championship, Barcelona, Spain, silver medal
 2012 FINA Women's Water Polo World League, Changsu, China, 3rd place
 2012 FINA Women's World Youth Water Polo Championships, Perth, Australia, 1st place
 2013 FINA Women's Water Polo Junior World Championships, Volos, Greece, 3rd place

References

1994 births
Living people
Olympiacos Women's Water Polo Team players
Greek female water polo players
Water polo players from Thessaloniki
21st-century Greek women